Gumdrop Seamount is a small seamount (underwater volcano) located on the flank of Pioneer Seamount, off the coast of Central California. It is the northernmost of the related seamounts in the region, which includes Davidson, Guide, Pioneer, and Rodriguez seamounts. It is defined by a series of aligned cones, the majority of which are poorly defined, separated by troughs filled with sediments. The largest cone rises to within  of sea level. Samples recovered from Gumdrop are highly vesicular in origin, and include alkalic basalt, hawaiite, and mugearite; however, their ages have yet to be determined.

References

Seamounts of the Pacific Ocean